Poperechnoye is a rural locality (a selo) and the administrative center of Poperechensky Selsoviet, Kamensky District, Altai Krai, Russia. The population was 783 as of 2013. There are 11 streets.

Geography 
Poperechnoye is located 49 km southwest of Kamen-na-Obi (the district's administrative centre) by road. Novoyarki is the nearest rural locality.

References 

Rural localities in Kamensky District, Altai Krai